Department of Markets may refer to:

Australia
Department of Markets and Transport
Department of Markets (1928)
Department of Markets (1930–1932)

United States
Commissioner of Public Markets, in New York City